Lord William Powlett (baptized 18 August 1666 – 25 September 1729) was an English Member of Parliament.

He was the younger son of Charles Paulet, 1st Duke of Bolton, and his second wife, Mary Scrope.

Career
Lord William held a number of offices, including:
 Freeman, Winchester 1689, Lymington, 1689
 Deputy Lieutenant for Hampshire, 1689–1729
 Commissioner for assessment, Hampshire and Yorkshire (West Riding), 1689–90
 Captain of militia foot, Winchester, by 1697
 Recorder, Grimsby, 1699–1729
 Justice of the Peace, Hampshire and Lincolnshire, 1699–1729
 Mayor of Lymington, Hampshire, 1701–5, 1724–5, 1728–1729
 Keeper of Rhinefield walk, New Forest, 1718–1729
 Farmer of green-wax fines, 1690–1706
 Teller of the Exchequer, 1714–1729

He served as Member of Parliament for Winchester from 1689 to 1710, for Lymington from 1710 to 1715 and for Winchester from 1715 until his death in 1729. Lord William became Father of the House of Commons in 1724, on the demise of Richard Vaughan, the member for Carmarthen.

Marriages and issue 
William Powlett married twice:
 His first wife was Louisa, daughter of Armand-Nompar de Caumont, Marquis de Montpouillon, and granddaughter of Henri-Nompar de Caumont, 3rd Duc de La Force, by whom he had two sons and two daughters:
 William Powlett, c. 1693 – February 1757, married Lady Annabella Bennet, daughter of :Charles Bennet, 1st Earl of Tankerville and had issue
 Maj. Gen. Sir Charles Armand Powlett, died 1751
 Mary Powlett (died 15 August 1718), married on 25 June 1714 Richard Parsons, 1st Earl of Rosse
 Jane Powlett

 He married as his second wife, Anne Egerton (died 1737) in October 1699, by whom he had one daughter:
 Henrietta Powlett (died 1755), married William Townshend (died 1738)

Death
He died on 25 September 1729, in his 63rd year, through a fall from his horse when riding in Hyde Park, London. Both his sons sat for various Hampshire boroughs as Whigs under George II.

Footnotes

Sources

External links
 POWLETT, Lord William (1667–1729), of Chilbolton, Hants and Marrick Priory, Yorks. A biography
 Lord William Powlett Family tree
 Charles Paulet, 6th Marquess of Winchester later 1st Duke of Bolton, PC
 The Father of the House

|-

1660s births
1729 deaths
Younger sons of dukes
William
People from Richmondshire (district)
People from Basingstoke and Deane
Mayors of places in Hampshire
English MPs 1689–1690
English MPs 1690–1695
English MPs 1695–1698
English MPs 1698–1700
English MPs 1701
English MPs 1701–1702
English MPs 1702–1705
English MPs 1705–1707
Members of the Parliament of Great Britain for English constituencies
British MPs 1707–1708
British MPs 1708–1710
British MPs 1710–1713
British MPs 1713–1715
British MPs 1715–1722
British MPs 1722–1727
British MPs 1727–1734
Deputy Lieutenants of Hampshire